Quarters 1 may refer to:

Quarters 1 (Fort Monroe), Hampton, Virginia
Quarters 1 (Fort Myer), Arlington, Virginia
Quarters 1 (Rock Island), Illinois
Quarters 1 Nimitz House, on Yerba Buena Island, California